Dapitan Kingdom (also called as Bool Kingdom) is the term used by local historians of Bohol to refer to the Dauis–Mansasa polity in the modern city of Tagbilaran and Panglao Island. The volume of artifacts unearthed in the sites of Dauis and Mansasa may have inspired the creation of the legend of "Dapitan Kingdom" through piecing together the oral legends of the Eskaya people and historical events such as the Ternatan raid of Bohol and the migration of Boholanos under Datu Pagbuaya to Dapitan.

History

Early History

In 1667, Father Francisco Combes, in his Historia de Mindanao, mentioned that at one time in their history, the people of the island of Panglao invaded mainland Bohol and subsequently imposing their economic and political dominance in the area. They considered the previous inhabitants of the islands as their slaves by reason of war, as witnessed for example by how Datu Pagbuaya, one of the rulers of Panglao, considered Datu Sikatuna as his vassal and relative. The invasion of mainland Bohol by the people of Panglao ushered the birth of the so-called Bohol "kingdom", also known as the "Dapitan Kingdom of Bohol". The Bohol "kingdom" prospered under the reign of the two brother rulers of Panglao - Datu Dailisan and Datu Pagbuaya, with trade links established with neighbouring Southeast Asian countries, particularly with the Sultanate of Ternate. The flourishing of trade in the Bohol "kingdom" is owed to its strategic location along the busy trading channels of Cebu and Butuan. For other countries such as Ternate to gain access to the busy trade ports of the Visayas, they need to first forge diplomatic ties with the Bohol "kingdom".

Relations between the Sultanate of Ternate and the Bohol soured when the Ternatan sultan learned the sad fate of his emissary and his men who were executed by the two ruling chieftains of Bohol as punishment for abusing one of the concubines. Thus, in 1563, the Ternatans attacked Bohol. Twenty joangas deceitfully posing as traders were sent by the sultan of Ternate to attack Bohol. Caught unaware, the inhabitants of Bohol could not defend themselves against the Ternatan raiders who were also equipped with sophisticated firearms like muskets and arquebuses, which the Boholanos saw for the first time. Such new weaponry were the result of the aid of the Portuguese to the Ternatan raid of Bohol. Many Boholanos lost their lives in this conflict, including that of Pagbuaya's brother Datu Dailisan. After the retaliatory Ternatan raid against Bohol, Datu Pagbuaya, who was left as the sole reigning chief of the island, decided to abandon mainland Bohol together with the rest of the freemen as they considered Bohol island unfortunate and accursed. They settled in the northern coast of the island of Mindanao, where they established the Dapitan settlement.

Spanish Conquest

Kingdom of Dapitan had been integral to the spread of Spanish conquest and control in the Philippines. The conquest of Philippines would have been impossible without the allegiance and help from several hundred of indigenous troops, including Visayan soldiers, who joined the Spanish cause to go to war.

Don Pedro Manuel Manooc, known for military and navigation skills aided the Spaniards in invasion of Manila on May 24, 1570 and Bicol (started from Camarines) on July 1573. In 1667, chronicler Fr. Francisco Combés, S.J described Manooc as Fiero, hombre que facilmente se embravece which means the one who gets easily heated like iron.

For sometime, during the conquest of Bicol, Manooc together with his kinsmen founded and settled in the villages of Bacon, Bulusan, Gubat and Magallanes, Sorsogon, protecting these coastal settlements from barbaric Moro pirates and paving the way for evangelical missions of the Franciscans. Nearly two hundred years later, on June 13, 1764, Manooc's great-grandson named Don Pedro Manook became the first gobernadorcillo of Gubat when it became an independent town.

Manooc also supported Spanish campaigns in Cebu, Mindanao, Caraga, and Jolo. On one recorded event, Manooc defeated the Sultan of Jolo  escaping as a fugitive, who had a fleet of 12 joangas and eventually captured the its flagship. In 1595, Manooc reached Lanao,  defeating the Maranaos which then under protection of the Sultanate of Maguindanao, eventually capturing the village of Bayug, a sitio in the present-day barangay Hinaplanon, and founded Iligan as one of the earliest Christian settlements in the country.

Manooc's daughter Doña Maria Uray later married warrior Gonzalo Maglinti. Manooc died and his remains were buried in front of the main altar of the Cebu Metropolitan Cathedral, a distinguished honor given for supporting the Spanish empire. After Manooc's death, son-in-law Maglinti and grandson Pedro Cabili (or Cabilin) defended Christian settlements opposing savages of Maranao and Maguindanao fleets from Sirawai, Zamboanga towards the ends of Iligan and Panguil Bay. Maglinti was also known for watching over the islands and dispatches information to established settlements in Cebu and Iloilo amid the threats from Moro pirates.

Pedro Cabili started as young as 7-years old when he joined his father Maglinti in the conquest and was also known as a fierce warrior perfectly skilled with hand-to-hand combat. In the 18th to the 19th century, the family dominated the politics in Dapitan and Iligan. During this time, Spanish used Dapitan as a military outpost for their operations against Moros. Spain constructed a number of forts along the north-western coast, in Dapitan, Iligan and Ozamis, supported by the Cabili family. Eventually, Cabili became the ancestor of future assemblyman, senator, and Defense secretary Tomas Cabili and Iligan gobernadorcillo Remigio Cabili; and mayors Brod and Camilo Cabili. Camilo Cabili also became a congressman of Iligan from 1984 to 1986 during the Regular Batasang Pambansa.

Captain Laria, cousin of Manooc served Spain in the conquest of Moluccas in 1606.

Manooc's sister, Doña Madalena Baluyot (or Bacuya) was known to be pacifier and peacemaker of varying factions of Subanon tribe which earned respect from its chiefs. In 1596, Doña Baluyot mediated between locals and missionaries; supporting Jesuits missions in Eastern Mindanao, eventually converting Datu Silongan (baptized as Felipe Silongan), ruler of Butuan that further lead to evangelization of Caraga and Davao Oriental.

In 1622, Datu Salangsang, Baluyot's grandson and ruler of present-day Cagayan de Oro and Misamis Oriental through her intervention allowed Augustinian Recollects missions to the province. Salangsang's seat of government was in Huluga, at the present day sitio Taguanao in southern barangay of Indahag but later transferred to and founded the present-day Cagayan de Oro upon the recommendation of Fr. Agustin de San Pedro (also known as El Padre Capitan) in 1627, securing the settlement amid the threats from Maranaos and Sultan Kudarat.

References

Former countries in Philippine history
Barangay states
Historical regions
History of the Philippines (900–1565)
History of Mindanao
History of Bohol
Historical Hindu kingdoms